Villebon is a commune in the department of Eure-et-Loir in northern France

The inhabitants are called Villebonnais.

Population

Personalities
 Maximilien de Béthune, duc de Sully

See also
Communes of the Eure-et-Loir department

References

Communes of Eure-et-Loir